The 1992 King Fahd Cup, named after Fahd of Saudi Arabia, was the first association football tournament of the competition that would later be known as the FIFA Confederations Cup. It was hosted by Saudi Arabia in October 1992, and was won by Argentina, who beat Saudi Arabia 3–1 in the final. The 1992 tournament was the only one not to feature a group stage and only featured four nations.

Qualified teams

Squads

Venue
All matches were played at the 67,000-capacity King Fahd II Stadium in Riyadh, Saudi Arabia.

Match referees
Africa
 Lim Kee Chong
Asia
 Jamal Al Sharif
North, Central America and Caribbean
 Rodrigo Badilla
South America
 Ulisses Tavares da Silva

Final tournament

Bracket

Semi-finals

Third place match

Final

Statistics

Goalscorers
With two goals, Gabriel Batistuta and Bruce Murray were the top scorers in the tournament. In total, 18 goals were scored by 16 different players, with none of them credited as own goal.

2 goals
 Gabriel Batistuta
 Bruce Murray
1 goal

 Alberto Acosta
 Ricardo Altamirano
 Claudio Caniggia
 Leonardo Rodríguez
 Diego Simeone
 Donald-Olivier Sié
 Abdoulaye Traoré
 Fahad Al-Bishi
 Khaled Al-Muwallid
 Saeed Al-Owairan
 Yousuf Al-Thunayan
 Marcelo Balboa
 Cobi Jones
 Eric Wynalda

Tournament ranking

References

External links

Intercontinental Champions Cup Saudi Arabia 1992 – FIFA.com
Intercontinental Cup for Nations 1992 – RSSSF

 
1992
King Fahd Cup 1992
King Fahd Cup
King Fahd Cup
 
King Fahd Cup
October 1992 events in Asia
1992 in association football